The term Triang can refer to
 Teriang, a town in Pahang, Malaysia.
 Tri-ang Railways, a British toy trains manufacturer.
 Lines Bros, a company using the Tri-ang brand name.